Big Time or The Big Time may refer to:

Film and television 
 Big Time (1929 film), a film starring Lee Tracy and Mae Clarke
 Big Time (1977 film), a film produced by Motown Productions
 Big Time (1988 film), a concert film featuring Tom Waits
 Big Time (1989 film), a TV movie featuring Paul Guilfoyle
 Big Time (2001 film), a film featuring Mark Valley
 The Big Time (2002 film), a 2002 TV movie starring Molly Ringwald and Christina Hendricks
 Big Time (2004 film), a film starring Matthew McGrory
 The Big Time (TV series), a 1976–1980 British documentary series
 The Big Time (South African TV series), a drama series starring Frank Opperman
 Steve Harvey's Big Time Challenge or Big Time, an American comedy/variety television show
 "The Big Time" (Sex and the City), an episode of Sex and the City

Literature 
 The Big Time (novel), a 1957 novel by Fritz Leiber
 "Spider-Man: Big Time", a run of comic book storylines in The Amazing Spider-Man
 The Big Time (play), a 2019 play by David Williamson
 Big Time, a play by Keith Reddin
 Big Time, weekly newspaper supplement published by Disney Magazine Publishing

Music 
 Big Time Records, an Australian record label

Albums 
 Big Time (Little Texas album)
 Big Time (Tom Waits album)
 Big Time (Trace Adkins album), and the title song
 Big Time (Ultra album), and the title song
 Big Time (soundtrack), a soundtrack album for the 1977 film, by Smokey Robinson
 The Big Time (album), a 2002 album by Robin Holcomb
 Big Time (Angel Olsen album)

Songs 
 "Big Time" (Trace Adkins song), 1997
 "Big Time" (Big & Rich song), 2005
 "Big Time" (C. C. Catch song), 1989
 "Big Time" (Peter Gabriel song), 1986
 "Big Time" (Whigfield song), 1995
 "Big Time", by Rick James from Garden of Love
 "Big Time", by Seal from Seal 6: Commitment
"Big Time", by Vince Staples from Prima Donna

See also 
 The Big Timer, 1932 American drama film
 Big Timers, 1945 American musical comedy film